John Charles "Red" Adams (March 2, 1887 – August 28, 1969) was a college football player and physician.

University of Mississippi
He was a prominent center for the Ole Miss Rebels football team of the University of Mississippi. Adams was nominated though not selected for an Associated Press All-Time Southeast 1869-1919 era team.

1912
Adams was captain of the 1912 team. He was selected All-Southern by Nathan Stauffer of Collier's Weekly.

Physician
During World War I, he worked for Standard Oil in Maricopa, California. He was later a doctor in Greenwood. In 1924, he married Vivian Muller in New Orleans.

References

External links

American football centers
All-Southern college football players
Ole Miss Rebels football players
Players of American football from Mississippi
People from Kosciusko, Mississippi
1887 births
1969 deaths
Sportspeople from Natchez, Mississippi
Physicians from Mississippi
People from Greenwood, Mississippi
 Standard Oil